Steve Donovan, Western Marshal (also known as Western Marshal) is an American Western series that aired in syndication from September 24, 1955 to June 6, 1956.

Cast and characters
Douglas Kennedy as United States Marshal Steve Donovan. 
Eddy Waller as Rusty Lee, assistant of Donovan.

Reception
Billboard described the 1951 pilot as "a slick swift-paced item which shows the know-how [producer Jack] Chertok picked up in the course of turning out his Lone Ranger series."

Steve Donovan, Texas Ranger
In July 1952, Consolidated Television Productions began syndication of Steve Donovan, Texas Ranger, which starred Kennedy. Twenty-six 30-minute filmed episodes were available. The program was a Jack Chertok production.

References

External links
 

1955 American television series debuts
1956 American television series endings
1950s Western (genre) television series
Black-and-white American television shows
English-language television shows
First-run syndicated television programs in the United States
Television series set in the 19th century
Television shows set in Wyoming
United States Marshals Service in fiction